Norman Brooks may refer to:

Norman Brooks (singer) (1928–2006), Canadian singer
Norman Brooks (swimmer) (1910–1953), English Olympic swimmer

See also
Norman Brookes (1877–1968), Australian tennis champion
Norman Brook, 1st Baron Normanbrook (1902–1967), British civil servant